Blowtorch is a fictional character from the G.I. Joe: A Real American Hero toyline, comic books and animated series. He is the G.I. Joe Team's original Flamethrower and debuted in 1984.

Profile
His real name is Timothy P. Hanrahan, and his rank is that of corporal (E-4). Blowtorch was born in Tampa, Florida.

Blowtorch's primary military specialty is infantry special weapons, and as his secondary military specialty he is a small-arms armorer. He is familiar with all military incendiary devices, flame projection equipment, pyrotechnics and heat-projection devices. He is a qualified expert with the M-7 Flamethrower, M-16 and the M1911A1 Auto Pistol. Blowtorch also studied for advanced degrees in both structural and chemical engineering.

In the UK's Action Force Blowtorch comes from Toulouse in France and "knows all there is to know about flame projection and incendiary devices. He has seen the damage fire can do and is scared by it. Has to sleep near a smoke detector."

Toys
Blowtorch was originally released as an action figure in 1984.

In 2002, as part of the G.I. Joe vs. Cobra line, a newly designed version of Blowtorch was released with Snow Serpent. A version of this Blowtorch also came with the Built to Rule Raging Typhoon, which followed the G.I. Joe: Spy Troops story line. The forearms and the calves of the figure sported places where blocks could be attached.

A modern update of the original Blowtorch was released as a part of the 25th anniversary line in early 2009. This version was re-released with a new paint deco and more accessories as part of the "Pursuit of Cobra" line in 2011.

Comics

Marvel Comics
In the Marvel Comics G.I. Joe series, he first appeared in issue #32, assisting Ripcord and Clutch in moving supplies, for a party to celebrate the reconstruction of G.I. Joe headquarters. In the next issue, Spirit convinces Blowtorch and Ripcord to sneak him out of the infirmary to the local mall. Spirit believes he can purchase more efficient medicines at the floral shop than they have in the infirmary. This unofficial mission leads the three Joes in a running battle, as the man who had wounded Spirit was also on a shopping trip. The trio are hailed as heroes by the other Joes, when a coincidence allows them to come back with the much needed party decorations.

He is featured in issue #37, when he goes with Gung-Ho and Ripcord to a local fair. They come under attack by the Cobra officers Tomax and Xamot. Blowtorch and Gung-Ho are fired upon as they ride a roller coaster; it is only the steel of the car that saves their lives. Both pretend to be dead and successfully defeat their enemies. Blowtorch has a cameo in issue #76. He is one of the members of a Cobra Island infiltration team to whom the Dreadnoks personally surrender.

Devil's Due
Blowtorch is active in the Devil's Due G.I. Joe series. He and Gung-Ho go undercover at an obscure federal prison, to help Chuckles escape the notice of Cobra. Acting as guards, they stage Chuckles' death, and then escort him to a safe house staffed by Joe agents. They then leave to enjoy a two-week vacation in New Orleans. He later takes part in battling Cobra and the Coil on Cobra Island.

During the World War III storyline, Blowtorch remains stateside. He and Barbecue help civilian firefighters in Chicago.

G.I. Joe vs. Transformers
In the alternate reality crossover with Transformers, Blowtorch is one of many guards keeping an eye on the helpful Wheeljack.

Animated series

Sunbow
In the Sunbow animated series, Blowtorch was voiced by Michael Bell in an Irish accent. He first appeared in the G.I. Joe animated series in the "Revenge of Cobra" mini-series. He has appeared in the following episodes:
 "Cobra Claws Are Coming To Town"
 "Red Rocket's Glare"
 "Joe Goes Hollywood"
 "The Most Dangerous Thing in the World"

G.I. Joe: The Movie
Blowtorch also appeared briefly in the 1987 animated film G.I. Joe: The Movie.

Video games
Blowtorch is one of the featured characters in the 1985 G.I. Joe: A Real American Hero computer game.

Books
Blowtorch is one of the featured supporting characters in the Find Your Fate G.I. Joe book "Operation: Star Raider".

References

External links
 Blowtorch at JMM's G.I. Joe Comics Home Page

Fictional characters from Tampa, Florida
Fictional corporals
Fictional military sergeants
Fictional staff sergeants
Fictional United States Army personnel
G.I. Joe soldiers
Male characters in animated series
Male characters in comics
Television characters introduced in 1984